Jocaste is a 1925 French silent drama film directed by Gaston Ravel and starring Thomy Bourdelle, Claude Mérelle and Sandra Milovanoff.

Cast
 Thomy Bourdelle as Dr. René Longuemarre 
 Claude Mérelle as Jocaste 
 Sandra Milovanoff as Hélène Haviland 
 Gabriel Signoret as Martin Haviland 
 Abel Tarride as Fellaire de Sizac 
 Henri Fabert as Dr. Groult 
 Jean Forest as Georges Haviland
 Simone Mareuil as Maîtresse de Fellaire de Sizac

References

Bibliography
 Alfred Krautz. International directory of cinematographers, set- and costume designers in film, Volume 4. Saur, 1984.

External links

1925 films
Films directed by Gaston Ravel
French silent films
French black-and-white films
French drama films
Pathé films
Silent drama films
1920s French films